Anolis pachypus, the thick anole, is a species of lizard in the family Dactyloidae. The species is found in Costa Rica and Panama.

References

Anoles
Reptiles of Costa Rica
Reptiles of Panama
Reptiles described in 1875
Taxa named by Edward Drinker Cope